Charles Macnamara (Charlie) O'Brien (March 2, 1875 – February 23, 1952) was a Canadian socialist activist and politician in Alberta, Canada. He served in the Legislative Assembly of Alberta from 1909 to 1913.

Biography

O'Brien was born at Bells Rapids, near Bangor, Hastings County, Ontario, to John Patrick and Matilda (née Price) O'Brien. His father, J.P. O'Brien perished in the sinking of the boat the Mayflower at the Madawaska River, in 1912. He worked in the logging, mining industry and in railroad camps. In 1899, he came west to Alberta while working for the railway, the Crowsnest Pass line of the Canadian Pacific Railway.

Becoming a "dedicated socialist", he joined the Socialist Party of Canada and became a national organizer for the party, and leader of its Alberta branch.

O'Brien was a skilled orator and author, drawing comparisons to prominent activists Bill Haywood, Jack London and Eugene V. Debs, in terms of his impact in Socialism in Canada.

O'Brien ran for the Legislative Assembly of Alberta in 1909 in the new Rocky Mountain constituency, and, despite not garnering official union support but much support among the district's coal-miners, was elected to the Legislative Assembly of Alberta in the 1909 Alberta general election as a member of the Socialist Party of Alberta, narrowly defeating Liberal John Angus Macdonald by 32 votes. He was the first Socialist member elected to the Alberta Legislature. It was said that O'Brien's election to the legislature "reflected a growing radicalization" of coal miners in Alberta; O'Brien's constituency at the time was mainly miners.

The local newspaper, Coleman Miner, blamed his election on his supporters buying the vote of naturalized immigrants, saying:

During his term in office, he worked to improve conditions for the miners, having run on that platform in his election bid. In December 1910, he introduced an amendment to the existing Coal Mines Act, proposing many additional safety measures in the industry. O'Brien also initiated a bill permitting the Alberta government to protect an apparent Russian fugitive (charged with murder for assassination of a Russian governor and arson) by refusing to extradite him back to Russia if investigation showed that he faced political persecution back in Russia. Upon the death of King Edward VII, members of the Legislature made speeches providing their condolences to the royal family, with O'Brien staying "Why all this empty hypocrisy? The king was a man who worked little and ate well". Other members of the Legislature threw ink wells and books at O'Brien after the statement. He would also participate in the Alberta and Great Waterways Railway debate.  O'Brien set a provincial legislative record, delivering a speech to the house on February 13, 1912, that was 5 hours and 50 minutes in length. He still had not finished his speech when the session was adjourned for the day.

While in office he continued his Socialist activism, giving speeches to promote it. In 1909 he was arrested while giving a speech near a highway in Regina. A crowd of 500 had gathered to listen, which resulted in O'Brien's arrest for obstructing traffic. An account of his political position is available on-line under the title "The Proletarian in Politics The Socialist Position As defended by C. M. O’Brien, MLA in the Alberta Legislature." In 1911 he engaged in a Canada-wide tour to promote Socialist ideals.

The Trades and Labour Congress of Canada endorsed him when he ran for re-election in 1913.

In the 1913 general election, he doubled his vote as compared to 1909 but was defeated by Conservative Robert E. Campbell, by just over 80 votes.

O'Brien moved to Los Angeles, California, around 1915, where he died in 1952.

Electoral history

Footnotes

External links
Socialist in Alberta: Socialist History Project
Legislative Assembly of Alberta Members Listing

Socialist Party of Alberta MLAs
Canadian people of Irish descent
1875 births
1952 deaths